"Soldiers" is an ABBA song, released on their 1981 album The Visitors. Its working title was "Peasants".

Synopsis
The song is a critique of militarism.

Billboard explains "emphasizing that although there seems to be so little one can do to prevent the machinations of soldiers and those who control them, we must "not look the other way/taking a chance/cos if the bugle starts to play/we too must dance". The Telegraph describes the premise of the song as "how warmongers convince themselves they are noble men".

Composition
The entire song rests upon a "simple two-note" statement". The song has a "string-ensemble synth arrangement". Agnetha uses a "subdued yet stoic vocal", and "the chorus vocals, while typically multi-tiered, are somewhat 'murkier' and less liberated in texture".

Critical reception and analysis
ABBA's ABBA Gold describes the song as "bleak-yet-catchy". Billboard notes its "simple yet ominous metaphors that envision impending nuclear holocaust". It goes on to explains "the offbeat cadence of the drumming holds dark, somber verses and the sing-song quality of the chorus together", and concludes by saying "certainly very few groups can effectively handle a subject as serious as this, and still imbue it with all the qualities of a great pop song". Billboard listed the song under the "Best cuts" section of an album review, along with four other songs from the album. ABBA: Let The Music Speak says the song has an "unsettling caution" and also "heart and humanity". The synths "gently inflame the sense of yearning throughout, driving along a backing track which features ...bass courtesy of Rutger Gunnarsson".

Cover versions
Scottish singer Barbara Dickson covered the song on her 1985 album Gold.

References

1981 songs
ABBA songs
Songs about nuclear war and weapons
Songs about soldiers
Songs about the military